Joseph Augustus Gillis (April 24, 1896 – December 19, 1967) was an American football player.  Born in Massachusetts, he played college football at Tufts and Detroit and professional football as a guard and tackle for the Toledo Maroons in the National Football League (NFL). He appeared in seven NFL games, two as a starter, during the 1923 season.

References

1896 births
1967 deaths
Toledo Maroons players
Tufts Jumbos football players
Detroit Titans football players